Benque may refer to:

 Benque Viejo del Carmen (or simply Benque), a town in Cayo District, Belize
 Benque Viejo, a town in Corozal District, Belize
 Benque, Haute-Garonne, a French commune
 Benqué, a former French commune
Benqué-Molère, a French commune
 Benque-Dessous-et-Dessus, French commune
 Franz Benque (1841–1921), German photographer